The Cure is a 2014 thriller starring Antonia Prebble and Daniel Lissing about a research scientist who finds out the company she works for has developed a cure for cancer. It was written, directed and produced by David Gould.

Plot
Researcher Beth Wakefield, (Prebble), works for ScopaMed Pharmaceuticals. She accidentally discovers the pharmaceutical company she works for had developed a cure for cancer many years earlier. They haven't released it because that would destroy their chemotherapy drug sales. She must now escape and release the cure to world while the company tries to stop her.

Cast
 Antonia Prebble as Beth Wakefield
 Stephen Lovatt as Ted Garner
 Daniel Lissing as Ryan Earl
 John Bach as Lionel Stanton
 John Landreth as Wentworth
 Nathalie Boltt as Ruby Wakefield
 Paul Yates as Mason Wakefield
 Craig Geenty as Rob
 Simon Vincent as Grant
 Lolo Owen as young Beth Wakefield

External links
 Official website
 
 

2014 films
New Zealand science fiction thriller films
2010s science fiction thriller films
American science fiction thriller films
CineTel Films films
Films about cancer
Films about drugs
Films about scientists
2010s English-language films
2010s American films